Slobodan Matijević (born 14 March 1988) is a Serbian bobsledder who has competed since 2009. He finished 18th in the four-man event at the 2010 Winter Olympics in Vancouver.

Matijevic also finished ninth in a four-man event at Cesana in January 2010 in a lesser event.

References

1988 births
Bobsledders at the 2010 Winter Olympics
Living people
Olympic bobsledders of Serbia
Serbian male bobsledders
Sportspeople from Rijeka
Serbs of Croatia